Windows Marketplace for Mobile was a service by Microsoft for its Windows Mobile platform that allowed users to browse and download applications that had been developed by third parties. The service was available for use directly on Windows Mobile 6.x devices (versions earlier than 6.5 require downloading a free Windows Marketplace for Mobile application) and on personal computers.  It was announced at the 2009 Mobile World Congress, and began operation on 6 October 2009, featuring an initial 246 applications. Initially it was available only for Windows Mobile 6.5, and was made available to older 6.x versions a few weeks later. On February 15, 2010 Microsoft announced its next generation mobile platform named Windows Phone; there is a separate app store, Windows Phone Store, for it; WM6.x apps are not compatible with WP7.

From July 15, 2011 Windows Mobile applications could no longer be downloaded from the website, but only by
signing into Marketplace for Mobile on a phone. Marketplace for Mobile was shut down on May 22, 2012.

Pricing and features
Windows Marketplace for Mobile, available through applications for Windows Mobile and personal computers, offered a 24-hour return policy for buyers, and 70% of each application sale was paid to developers. A one-time $99 USD fee for developers to list an unlimited number of paid applications or up to five free applications yearly in the store was charged by Microsoft.  After five free applications were listed for the year, each additional free application could be listed for a $19.99 USD fee.  Microsoft accepted payment from buyers through credit cards and carrier charges.

Students who were members of Microsoft's DreamSpark program could submit applications to the store for free, waiving the $99 USD fee.

Carriers had the ability to create a branded section of the store to market carrier-specific applications and services for their customers.

Content restrictions
Microsoft did not distribute certain types of apps, including those with sexual content, via the Marketplace. Banned applications include:
 Sex and nudity – Images that are suggestive or sexual (e.g. sexually provocative touching, bondage) or provocative images that reveal full nudity.
 Any adult or borderline adult content (images or text).
 Content that generally falls under the category of pornography.

History
Rumors about the service began to surface around the internet in September 2008, whereas it was referred to as "Skymarket", and was to appear with the Windows Mobile 7 release.  Rumors stemmed from an online job listing from Microsoft's website calling for a "Senior Product Manager".

On February 16, 2009, Microsoft made an official announcement for the service at the 2009 Mobile World Congress for use with upcoming Windows Mobile 6.5 devices.  The company then announced that availability of the service would be by the end of 2009.

The store opened for business on 6 October 2009, featuring 246 applications.

On November 12, 2009, the Marketplace web application was opened.

The Marketplace website announced in mid-2011: "On July 15th [2011] this website will no longer offer Windows Mobile 6.x applications for download. If you have a Windows Mobile 6.x phone you can continue accessing the application store from the Marketplace client on your phone. ... [you must] sign into Marketplace for Mobile on your phone ... to buy apps". It was later announced that Marketplace for Mobile would be discontinued on May 9, 2012.

On July 15, 2011, Microsoft announced that they will no longer be accepting submissions for new applications or updates to existing ones.

See also
List of digital distribution platforms for mobile devices

References

Windows Mobile
Microsoft software
Mobile software distribution platforms